Stanley Robert "Stan" Nowotny (born 6 September 1950) is a former Australian rules football player who played for the  Swan Districts Football Club in the West Australian Football League (WAFL) from 1969 to 1983.

References

External links

1950 births
Living people
Swan Districts Football Club players
Australian rules footballers from Western Australia
West Australian Football Hall of Fame inductees